The 1st Mediterranean Grand Prix was a motor race, run for Formula One cars, held on 19 August 1962 at the Autodromo di Pergusa, Sicily. The race was run over 50 laps of the circuit, and was dominated by Ferrari. The winner was Lorenzo Bandini in a Ferrari 156.

Results

References

Mediterranean Grand Prix
Mediterranean Grand Prix
1962 in Italian motorsport